WLPN-LP is a low-power radio station in Chicago started by Lumpen founder Edward Marszewski in 2015 who started a kickstarter campaign to raise funds for the station. The station operates out of an art gallery called the 'Co-Prosperity Sphere'.

See also
 Lumpen (magazine)

References

External links
 Official Website
 

LPN-LP
Radio stations established in 2016
2016 establishments in Illinois
LPN-LP